Gribbon is a surname. People with that name include:

 Eddie Gribbon (1890-1965), American film actor, brother of Harry
 Harry Gribbon (1885-1961), American film actor, brother of Eddie
 Mike Gribbon (born 1957), American soccer player

See also
 Diana Gribbon Motz (born 1943), United States Circuit Judge of the United States Court of Appeals for the Fourth Circuit
 George Sutcliffe (George Gribbon Sutcliffe, 1895-1964), Australian public servant